Sung-Ho Kang (born April 8, 1972) is an American actor. His first major role was as Han Lue in the Fast & Furious franchise, a character he first portrayed in Better Luck Tomorrow (2002). Kang also played John Mak in the television series Power.

Early life
Kang was born in Clarkston, Georgia, to South Korean immigrant parents before moving to Gainesville, Georgia. He was raised by his Korean mother and African American stepfather. He moved to Barstow, California while in high school.

Kang attended the University of California, Riverside. While in college he chose acting over law school, a decision which was met with disappointment from his parents due to their concerns over the lack of Asian Americans on American television and lack of job prospects.

Career
Kang's first major role was in Better Luck Tomorrow (2002), in which he played Han Lue, an aloof gang member, directed by Justin Lin. He was one of the stars in The Motel, in which he played Sam Kim.

Kang reprised his role as Han Lue in the Fast & Furious franchise, first appearing in The Fast and the Furious: Tokyo Drift, the second movie directed by Justin Lin once again. Initially seen as a one-off character in an almost straight-to-DVD release, Kang's role in Tokyo Drift was intended as a single-scene role for a rapper to make a cameo, tossing his keys to the main character (portrayed by Lucas Black). As production progressed, Lin expanded Han to a significant supporting character which proved "emotionally affecting" and "a more delicate touch than the Fast movies had seen before, or since". In portraying Han, Kang "[emulated] the laid-back cool of the Paul Newmans and Steve McQueens" with "an added Pitt-esque obsession with constantly snacking". This made Kang a fan favorite and so he was subsequently brought back to the Fast & Furious franchise by director Justin Lin, subsequently appearing in Fast & Furious, Fast Five, Fast & Furious 6, and short film, Los Bandoleros.  

Kang also had a role in Jet Li's film War (2007), playing an FBI agent, and was featured in the movie Forbidden Warrior as Doran, a son of Genghis Khan. He had a small role in the action movie Live Free or Die Hard, and he appeared in Walter Hill's movie Bullet to the Head (2013) as Detective Taylor Kwon, opposite Sylvester Stallone.

Kang has had several notable television roles, including the recurring role of the narcissistic President Gin Kew Yun Chun Yew Nee in the Korean drama parody "Tae Do (Attitudes and Feelings, Both Desirable and Sometimes Secretive)" alongside Bobby Lee on MADtv. He portrayed FBI Agent Tae Kim in the short-lived crime procedural Gang Related on FOX. Both roles required him to speak Korean, which he is conversant in. The character Tae Kim was written specifically for him by creator Chris Morgan, whom he had worked with on the Fast & Furious franchise.

Kang started the YouTube channel "Sung's Garage" in January 2020, which hosts the videos for the podcast of the same name.

Kang credits reporter Jen Yamato of the Los Angeles Times and her #JusticeForHan social media campaign for rallying public interest and bringing the character of Han Lue back to the Fast & Furious franchise, in which he reprises his role in F9 (2021), reuniting with director Justin Lin once more.

In 2022, Kang portrayed Fifth Brother in the Disney+ series Obi-Wan Kenobi.

Other ventures

Business
He owned a restaurant called Saketini in Brentwood, Los Angeles, California, which closed in early 2013.

Kang launched a watch with Perrelet in 2016.

Auto drifting
Kang has said that, prior to his casting as Han in The Fast and the Furious: Tokyo Drift, he had been unaware of the drifting culture that existed in Japan. It was not until he began researching the part that he perfected his skills in this popular sport, which is a global craze. He stated that filming the Fast & Furious film franchise rekindled a long-dormant interest in cars; he had grown up watching an elderly neighbor restore vintage cars.

Filmography

Film

Television

Video games

References

External links

 

UCLA Asia Pacific Arts Interview
Back Stage Interview
Sung Kang's 2015 profile at The New York Times

American male actors of Korean descent
American male television actors
American male film actors
American people of South Korean descent
Male actors from Georgia (U.S. state)
Male actors from Greater Los Angeles
People from Barstow, California
People from Gainesville, Georgia
20th-century American male actors
21st-century American male actors
Living people
1972 births